The Poke-O-Moonshine Mountain Fire Observation Station is a historic fire lookout tower on Poke-O-Moonshine Mountain at Chesterfield in Essex County, New York. The tower is a prefabricated structure built by the Aermotor Windmill Company.

It was added to the National Register of Historic Places in 2001.

See also
National Register of Historic Places listings in Essex County, New York

References

Government buildings completed in 1917
Towers completed in 1917
Government buildings on the National Register of Historic Places in New York (state)
Civilian Conservation Corps in New York (state)
Buildings and structures in Essex County, New York
Fire lookout towers in Adirondack Park
Fire lookout towers on the National Register of Historic Places in New York (state)
National Register of Historic Places in Essex County, New York